The Department of Employment and Industrial Relations was an Australian government department that existed between December 1975 and December 1978.

History
The Department was announced in December 1975, separating the employment and industrial functions from the immigration functions in the previous Department of Labor and Immigration.

Scope
Information about the department's functions and/or government funding allocation could be found in the Administrative Arrangements Orders, the annual Portfolio Budget Statements and in the Department's annual reports.

At its creation, the Department was responsible for the following:
Industrial relations, including conciliation and arbitration in relation to industrial disputes 
Commonwealth Employment Service
Re-instatement in civil employment of national servicemen, members of the Reserve Forces and members of the Citizen Forces.

Structure
The Department was an Australian Public Service department, staffed by officials who were responsible to the Minister for Employment and Industrial Relations, Tony Street.  The Secretary of the department was Keith McKenzie.

References

Ministries established in 1975
Employment and Industrial Relations